"A Hundred Yards Over the Rim" is episode 59 of the American television anthology series The Twilight Zone, and is the 23rd episode of the second season. It originally aired on April 7, 1961, on CBS. The episode was written by series creator and showrunner Rod Serling. It was directed by filmmaker Buzz Kulik, and was shot on film, unlike some recent episodes. This was the first of two appearances on The Twilight Zone by Cliff Robertson, the second being in the 1962 episode "The Dummy".

Opening narration

Plot
In the year 1847, Chris Horn is the leader of a small wagon train from Ohio attempting to reach California. Horn's wife and young son Christian are riding in one of the group's covered wagons. Christian is dangerously ill and the others advise Horn they wish to turn back, as they are running out of supplies and lack medicine for the sick. Determined to keep going, Horn sets off alone to a nearby hill, in a desperate search for water and sustenance.

Upon crossing over the rim, Horn suddenly finds himself in 1961 New Mexico and is perplexed to see telephone poles, a hard black road, and a motorized vehicle coming at him. He stumbles out of the way, accidentally firing his rifle and grazing his arm. He comes to a small café and gas station, owned by Joe and Mary Lou. Joe gives Horn water while Mary Lou tends to his injury, offering him penicillin, which she explains will ward off infection. They ask where he is from, curious about his old-fashioned clothes and antique yet seemingly new rifle. However, they do not believe his story, and consider him mentally unstable.

Joe calls a local doctor to come check on Horn. The doctor finds him fit and seemingly rational, with only the implausibility of the man's story giving him reason to think otherwise, and calls the local sheriff. Meanwhile, Horn has found an encyclopedia containing a brief biographical entry for "Horn, Christian Jr., M.D.", who did great work with children's diseases in late 19th-century California. Horn concludes this is his son, and believes that he has been brought to this place to save him. Taking the penicillin tablets with him, he leaves and runs back toward the rim.

The arriving sheriff and Joe pursue Horn, who stumbles and drops his rifle before scrambling back over the rim. He sees the wagon train where he had left it, then looks back over the rim to find the territory unsettled. After giving his son a dose of penicillin, Horn leads the party onward to the spring and California. Concurrently, Joe and the sheriff have returned to the café. Joe tells Mary Lou that Horn simply vanished and all they found was Horn's rifle on the ground where he dropped it. Looking at it, they see that it now shows the effects of more than 100 years of exposure.

Closing narration

Production
The location shooting for the scenes of the wagon train in the sand dunes and the exterior of the roadside diner was carried out at Olancha, California in the Owens Valley, located on U.S. Route 395, approximately 300 km north of Los Angeles, adjacent to the Sierra Nevada mountains. This is one of two Twilight Zone episodes filmed at this locale, the other being "Third from the Sun" (1960). The distinctive geography of the Olancha area was also used for location shooting for the feature films Tremors (1990), Bug (2006), and Iron Man (2008).

References
 DeVoe, Bill. (2008). Trivia from The Twilight Zone. Albany, GA: Bear Manor Media. 
 Grams, Martin. (2008). The Twilight Zone: Unlocking the Door to a Television Classic. Churchville, MD: OTR Publishing.

External links
 

1961 American television episodes
The Twilight Zone (1959 TV series season 2) episodes
Television episodes about time travel
Television episodes set in New Mexico
Television episodes written by Rod Serling
Fiction set in 1847
Fiction set in 1961